Comamonas zonglianii is a Gram-negative, aerobic, oxidase- and catalase-positive, nonmotile bacterium from the genus Comamonas and family  Comamonadaceae, which was isolated from a phenol-contaminated soil. Colonies of C. zonglianii are pale yellow in color.

References

External links
Type strain of Comamonas zonglianii at BacDive -  the Bacterial Diversity Metadatabase

Comamonadaceae
Bacteria described in 2011